The 1977 DFB-Pokal Final decided the winner of the 1976–77 DFB-Pokal, the 34th season of Germany's knockout football cup competition. The original final was played on 28 May 1977 at the Niedersachsenstadion in Hanover. The match between Hertha BSC and 1. FC Köln finished 1–1 after extra time, requiring a replay two days later. On 30 May 1977, once again at the Niedersachsenstadion in Hanover, 1. FC Köln won the replay 1–0 to claim their 2nd cup title.

This was the first and only DFB-Pokal final ever to require a replay, as the final rules changed the next season, requiring a penalty shoot-out if the scores remain level following extra time.

Route to the final
The DFB-Pokal began with 128 teams in a single-elimination knockout cup competition. There were a total of six rounds leading up to the final. Teams were drawn against each other, and the winner after 90 minutes would advance. If still tied, 30 minutes of extra time was played. If the score was still level, a replay would take place at the original away team's stadium. If still level after 90 minutes, 30 minutes of extra time was played. If the score was still level, a penalty shoot-out was used to determine the winner.

Note: In all results below, the score of the finalist is given first (H: home; A: away).

Original match

Details

Replay

Details
Replay

References

External links
 Final and replay match reports at kicker.de 
 Final and replay match reports at WorldFootball.net
 Final and replay match reports at Fussballdaten.de 

Hertha BSC matches
1. FC Köln matches
1976–77 in German football cups
1977
Sports competitions in Hanover
20th century in Hanover
May 1977 sports events in Europe